Glufimet (developmental code name RGPU-238), also known as dimethyl 3-phenylglutamate hydrochloride, is a derivative of glutamic acid (glutamate) which was developed in Russia and is related to the γ-aminobutyric acid (GABA) derivative phenibut (3-phenyl-GABA). It contains phenibut and glycine fragments in its chemical structure, has been described as a "GABA precursor", and is said to modulate the GABA and nitric oxide (NO) systems and to have antioxidant activity. It has been suggested that metabotropic glutamate receptors may also play a role in the mechanism of action of glufimet. Stress-protective effects have been described for glufimet in animals.

References

Amino acids
Dicarboxylic acids
Drugs with unknown mechanisms of action
Experimental drugs
GABA analogues
Glutamates
Russian drugs